M. S. R. Rajavarman is an Indian politician and is Member of the Legislative Assembly of Tamil Nadu. He was elected to the Tamil Nadu legislative assembly as an All India Anna Dravida Munnetra Kazhagam candidate from Sattur constituency in the by-election in 2019.

Electoral performance

References 

Living people
All India Anna Dravida Munnetra Kazhagam politicians
Members of the Tamil Nadu Legislative Assembly
People from Virudhunagar district
Year of birth missing (living people)
Amma Makkal Munnetra Kazhagam politicians